Amicalola is an unincorporated community located in Dawson County, Georgia, United States. It was named for the falls and nearby Amcalola Mountain. Amicalola means tumbling water in the Cherokee language; the Cherokee people lived throughout Georgia and southeastern Tennessee before Indian Removal.

A post office called Amicalola was established in 1846, and remained in operation until 1923. The community takes its name from nearby Amicalola Creek.

References

Unincorporated communities in Dawson County, Georgia
Unincorporated communities in Georgia (U.S. state)